Grace Inez Crawford, also known as Grace Lovat Fraser (1889–1977) was an American singer, actress, costume designer, translator of plays, and author of several books.

Biography
She was born in Paris in 1889, daughter of Theron Clark Crawford, an American entrepreneur, and a highly trained amateur pianist. Her father's professional projects (including work with Buffalo Bill Cody's "Wild West Show") caused the family to reside in various European and American cities, but England was considered home. Crawford's circle of acquaintances in London included Ezra Pound, Ford Madox Ford, Violet Hunt, William Butler Yeats, and D. H. Lawrence.

Crawford received training in voice, ballet, piano, and music theory, as well as French, German and Italian. She met her future husband, artist Claud Lovat Fraser, during a fitting for a faun costume for Hugo Rumbold's adaptation of L'Apres-midi d'un Faune. After a brief courtship, they were married February 6, 1917. During the next four years, until Fraser's death in 1921, the two worked jointly on a number of theatre projects, including La Serva Padrona and 'The Liar' (both of which Crawford translated), and Fraser's long-running production of The Beggar's Opera. Their daughter, Helen Catherine Adeline Lovat Fraser, was born in 1918.

After Fraser's death, Crawford promoted and protected his artistic legacy through exhibitions and publications. She continued her own work in singing and in costume design, working with prominent music and theatre figures of the time, including composer Arthur Bliss, Sergei Diaghilev, and Nigel Playfair. Tamara Karsavina, the Russian ballerina, was a lifelong friend.

Crawford also worked in other design-related businesses. In 1923 she formed a firm with Norman Wilkinson and a Mr. Trevelean that specialized in scenery and dress for the theatre, interior decoration for the home, hand printed fabrics, and "modern" clothing. She was editor of the magazine Art and Industry, worked in the design departments of Schweppes and Venesta Limited, and served for a time on the Research and Industrial Design Advisory Departments of Pritchard, Wood & Partners, Ltd.

Her memoirs, In the Days of My Youth, was published in 1970.

Marriage and children
Crawford married artist Claud Lovat Fraser on February 6, 1917. Their daughter, Helen Catherine Adeline Lovat Fraser, was born in 1918.

Published works
Doll Making at Home (1940)
Textiles in Britain (1948)
In the Days of My Youth (1970)

References

External links 
The Claud Lovat Fraser and Grace Crawford Lovat Fraser Collection at Bryn Mawr College Library

1889 births
1977 deaths
American costume designers
Women costume designers